Limnaecia tetraplanetis is a moth of the family Cosmopterigidae. It is known from Australia and New Guinea.

References

Limnaecia
Moths described in 1897
Taxa named by Edward Meyrick
Moths of Australia
Moths of New Guinea